Malinovka can refer to:
 Malinovka (Perm Krai), a tributary of the Mulyanka in Perm Krai
 Malinovka (Primorsky Krai), a tributary of the Bolshaya Ussurka in Primorsky Krai
 Maļinovka, Latvia
 Malynivka, Kharkiv Oblast, a settlement in eastern Ukraine
 Akmol, formerly named Malīnovka, Kazakhstan